The Hitler Stalingrad Speech was an address made by Adolf Hitler to senior members of the Nazi Party on November 8, 1942.  The speech took place at the Löwenbräukeller in Stiglmaierplatz in Munich during the height of the Battle of Stalingrad.

Media references

The Hitler Stalingrad Speech is portrayed in the film Stalingrad, where a group of embattled Wehrmacht soldiers listen to the speech from their entrenched positions within the city of Stalingrad. The speech is also featured in an episode of the 1988 miniseries "War and Remembrance," when Hitler was addressing party faithful.

References

External links

 Hitler Provides Statistics For The Strategic Importance Of Stalingrad
 Speech in Full

World War II speeches
Speeches by Adolf Hitler
November 1942 events
1942 in Germany
1940s in Munich
Battle of Stalingrad
1942 speeches